The 1968 Australian Touring Car Championship was a CAMS sanctioned Australian motor racing title open to Group C Improved Production Touring Cars. It was contested over a single race staged at the Warwick Farm circuit in New South Wales, Australia on 8 September 1968. The title, which was the ninth Australian Touring Car Championship, was won by Ian Geoghegan driving a Ford Mustang. It was the final Australian Touring Car Championship held as a single race, with the title being contested over a series of races from 1969 onwards.

Report
Ian Geoghegan qualified on pole position, half a second faster than Norm Beechey who was now driving a Chevrolet Camaro SS. Bob Jane was third on the grid, with Jim McKeown and Peter Manton rounding out the top five. Geoghegan won the start and took the lead into the first corner ahead of Beechey and Jane, with the latter two almost touching halfway through the first lap. McKeown retired on lap 3 with a broken rear axle. Ian Dawson spun on the following lap while Nick Petrilli lost a wheel; a lap later Rod Coppins slowed with a loose exhaust.

Jane's engine blew on lap 9, leaving Beechey as the sole challenger to Geoghegan. Fred Gibson's pit crew displayed a sign reading 'Jane in' to inform him of Jane's retirement, but Gibson misread the sign. He slowed on the following lap and pitted, losing six positions in the process. Beechey retired on lap 12 with mechanical problems, while Foley followed suit on the next lap. This left Geoghegan with a lead of twenty seconds over Paul Fahey and Manton.

Fahey retired on lap 22, while Gibson had been making his way back through the field. Manton ran into problems on lap 28, allowing the Porsche 911 of Alan Hamilton into second and the Morris Cooper S of Darrell King into third. King attempted to close the gap to Hamilton, but collided with Graham Ryan and backed off to settle for third place. However, on the final lap, Hamilton went off the circuit and damaged a rear guard, folding it onto the tyre. King went through into second and finished over ninety seconds behind race winner Geoghegan, while Hamilton brought his car home with a blown tyre for third.

Results

Class winners are indicated by bold text.

Statistics
 Pole position: Ian Geoghegan, 1:42.8
 Fastest lap: Ian Geoghegan, 1:43.0
 Race distance: 34 laps, 123.08 km
 Average speed: 124.93 km/h

References

External links
Video of the 1968 Australian Touring Car Championship, www.youtube.com
Images of 1968 Australian touring car racing, autopics.com.au

Australian Touring Car Championship seasons
Touring Car Championship
Motorsport at Warwick Farm